Parliamentary elections were held in Madagascar on 27 May 2019 to elect the 151 members of the National Assembly.

Electoral system
The 151 members of the National Assembly were elected by two methods; 87 were elected from single-member constituencies by first-past-the-post voting, with the remaining 64 elected from 32 two-seat constituencies.

Results

References

Malagasy parliamentary election
Parliamentary election
Elections in Madagascar
Election and referendum articles with incomplete results